Contadina de Asís is an 1888 oil on canvas painting by the Spanish painter Joaquín Sorolla.

Description 
The painting is part of the collection of the Sorolla Museum, in Madrid, Spain. It was painted in the year 1888, at a small town of Assisi in Italy, after the retirement of the painter, Joaquín Sorolla. He always wanted to paint natural beauty something realistic in nature. It is a feminine portrait of a peasant woman standing in a landscape full of vegetation and dotted with poppies. The woman appears to be slightly turning her head to the right. She wore a red scarf, which covered her head and knotted at the nape of her neck and clad with a white blouse which appears to had covered by a red bodice, matching the entire attire.

The painting depicts use of bright ranges of natural colours with an ease of brush work which is true to nature.

References

1888 paintings
Paintings by Joaquín Sorolla
Portraits by Spanish artists